Walter Dean Vargas(October 18, 1971) is an Olympic Taekwondo trainer and former Taekwondo representative  having garnered third place in the men's 58 kilogram division.
  He won a bronze medal at the 1993 World Taekwondo Championships, and a silver medal at the 1994 Asian Taekwondo Championships.

References

External links 
Olympedia

Filipino martial artists
Filipino male taekwondo practitioners
Asian Taekwondo Championships medalists
Living people
1971 births